Rocquemont is a commune in the Seine-Maritime department in the Normandy region in northern France.

Geography
The A28 autoroute now forms most of the south-western border of the commune.

Population

Places of interest
 A nineteenth century church.

See also
Communes of the Seine-Maritime department

References

Communes of Seine-Maritime